Gaius Hostilius Mancinus was a Roman consul in 137 BC. Due to his campaign against Numantia in northern Spain, Plutarch called him "not bad as a man, but most unfortunate of the Romans as a general."  During this campaign in the Numantine War, Mancinus was defeated, showing some cowardice, allegedly putting out his fires and trying to flee by night before being surrounded and forced to make peace.  According to Plutarch, Tiberius Gracchus was instrumental in bringing about the peace and saving 20,000 Roman soldiers.  He returned home something of a hero, but Mancinus was put on trial by the senate, which refused to accept the treaty.  While Gracchus and other lieutenants were saved by Scipio Aemilianus, the senate decreed that Mancinus be handed over to the Numantines, as some 20 Roman commanders were handed over to the Samnites after the defeat at the Caudine Forks in 321 BC. Plutarch does not relate Mancinus' further fate, but Appian noted that he was taken to Spain and handed over naked to the Numantines, but that they refused to accept him.  He seems to have returned to Rome, where he took his seat in the senate, but in the following year, Publius Rutilius, one of the tribunes of the plebs, ordered him to vacate it, on the ground that when he had been surrendered to the Numantines, he had lost his Roman citizenship.

See also 
 Hostilia gens

References 

Year of birth missing
Year of death missing
2nd-century BC Roman consuls
Mancinus, Gaius